In mathematics, a primitive root may mean:

 Primitive root modulo n in modular arithmetic
 Primitive nth root of unity amongst the solutions of zn = 1 in a field

See also
 Primitive element (disambiguation)